The 1967 Grambling Tigers football team represented Grambling College (now known as Grambling State University) as a member of the Southwestern Athletic Conference (SWAC) during the 1967 NCAA College Division football season. In its 25th season under head coach Eddie Robinson, Grambling compiled a 9–1 record (6–1 against conference opponents), won the SWAC championship, defeated  in the Orange Blossom Classic, and outscored opponents by a total of 318 to 145. The team is recognized as the black college football national co-champion for 1967.

Schedule

References

Grambling
Grambling State Tigers football seasons
Black college football national champions
Southwestern Athletic Conference football champion seasons
Grambling Tigers football